Goodbye & Good Riddance is the debut studio album by American rapper and singer Juice Wrld. It was released on May 23, 2018, by Grade A Productions and Interscope Records. Production was primarily handled by Nick Mira alongside several other record producers, including Benny Blanco, Cardo, CBMix, Don Rob, Dre Moon, and Mitch Mula. It features a sole guest appearance from fellow American rapper Lil Uzi Vert. On May 28, 2021, the album was re-released to commemorate its third anniversary; the re-release includes a new song titled "734" as well as a remix of "Lucid Dreams" featuring Lil Uzi Vert (retaining his status as the sole feature), while excluding the single "Armed and Dangerous", which was featured on the December 10, 2018 Spotify and Tidal reissue of the album.

Background and reissues 
In an interview with Zane Lowe on Beats 1 Radio, Juice Wrld spoke on the background of the album, stating:

The album was originally uploaded to SoundCloud under the title Fuck You Bella; this would later be changed to Goodbye & Good Riddance, with all references to the titular Bella being removed from the tracklist. For example, a skit titled "Bella's Betrayal" was changed to simply "Betrayal".

On July 10, 2018, the album was reissued to include the track “Wasted” featuring Lil Uzi Vert, which was also released as a single on the same day. This edition of the album would later be released on vinyl.

On December 10, 2018, a further reissue of the album would appear on the streaming services Spotify and Tidal. This exclusive edition of the album features a re-organized tracklist and includes the single “Armed and Dangerous”.

On May 28, 2021, the album was re-released to commemorate its third anniversary. This reissue included two new tracks, one titled "734" and the other being a remix of "Lucid Dreams” featuring Lil Uzi Vert. “Armed and Dangerous” was excluded from this edition of the album.

Singles 
The album's lead single, "All Girls Are the Same", was released on April 13, 2018. The song peaked at number 41 on the US Billboard Hot 100.

The second single, "Lucid Dreams", was released on May 4, 2018. The song peaked at number two on the Hot 100.

The third single, "Lean wit Me", was released on May 22, 2018. The song peaked at number 68 on the Hot 100.

The fourth single, "Wasted" featuring Lil Uzi Vert, was released on July 10, 2018, alongside a reissue of the album, shortly after premiering on Zane Lowe's Beats 1 radio. The song peaked at number 67 on the Hot 100.

The fifth single, "Armed and Dangerous", was released on October 15, 2018, and included on another reissue of the album exclusive to Spotify and Tidal in December 2018. The song peaked at number 44 on the Hot 100.

Critical reception 

Jay Balfour of Pitchfork described Goodbye & Good Riddance as "an adolescent breakup record that is equal parts endearing and grating", praising the album's sound: "his heart-on-his-sleeve coping sounds both ingratiating and grating. In that way at least, he's bottled up sad sap adolescence remarkably well". Bryan Hahn of HipHopDX criticized the lyricism for being "without any focus on creative stanzas or convincing in-depth first-person experiences". He later said Higgins has the potential to grow as an artist, remarking "Juice's best potential songwriting is yet to come" and "Juice feels willing to keep things interesting for the sake of art and is backed by a moderate understanding (and interest) in varied melodies and cadences".

In the 2022 listing, Rolling Stone named Goodbye & Good Riddance the 199th greatest hip-hop album of all time.

Commercial performance 
Goodbye & Good Riddance debuted at number 15 on the US Billboard 200 with 39,000 album-equivalent units in its first week. In its second week, the album moved up to number eight with an additional 45,000 units. In its third week, the album climbed the chart to number six with 42,000 album-equivalent units. As of March 2019, Goodbye & Good Riddance has earned a million album-equivalent units in the United States. On October 29, 2021, the album was certified triple platinum by the Recording Industry Association of America (RIAA) for combined sales and album-equivalent units of over three million units.

Track listing 
Credits adapted from Tidal.

Sample credits
 "Intro" and "Karma (Skit)" contains a sample of "Lovely", as performed by Billie Eilish and Khalid.
 "Scared of Love" contain a sample of "So High", as performed by Ghost Loft.
 "Lucid Dreams” features an interpolation of "Shape of My Heart", as performed by Sting.
 "Used To" contains a sample of "Crescent Moon", as performed by FELT.

Personnel 
Credits adapted from Tidal.

Technical
 Don Rob – mixing 
 Justin Craig — mixing (track 4)
 Lil Bibby – mixing 
 James Kang – mixing

Charts

Weekly charts

Year-end charts

Decade-end charts

Certifications

Release history

Notes

References

External links 

2018 debut albums
Juice Wrld albums
Albums produced by Cardo
Interscope Records albums
Albums produced by Benny Blanco
Albums produced by Cashmere Cat
Albums produced by Cardo (record producer)
Albums produced by Taz Taylor (record producer)